Halitrephes maasi, commonly known on the internet as the firework jellyfish, is a species of deep sea hydrozoan of the family Halicreatidae. The most recent account of the jelly has been found at a depth of  near the Revillagigedo Archipelago off Baja California Peninsula, Mexico.

Although not much is known regarding this species, research proves that Halitrephes maasi can be found in diverse settings of waters. The hydrozoan has been spotted in both temperate and tropical waters, and has been found in the Atlantic, Indo-Pacific, Antarctic, Mediterranean, and eastern Pacific. This hydromedusae is typically bathypelagic. and eastern Pacific. In these waters, this species is most commonly found in oxygen minimal zones and deep waters.

All cnidarians are diploblastic acoelomate metazoans, with tissue constructions levels. The majority of the organisms in the phylum project lengthy hollow piercing tubular-filaments that are used to inject toxins and poison into their prey. Cnidarians are basic animals both physically and biologically. There is only one opening that functions as the mouth and the anus in its digestive system.

References

External links
 Deep Sea Jelly at 

Halicreatidae
Animals described in 1909
Monotypic cnidarian genera
Hydrozoan genera